Artit Somnoei or stage name Ble Patumrach R-Siam is a Thai Luk thung singer, songwriter and Net idol.

Biography
His nickname is Ble. He was born on 30 June 1996 at Amnat Charoen Province. He is on stage for Thai music from 2015 to the present.

He graduated at Prathumrach Wongsa School, Secondary 6 in 2014.

Discography

Single Discography
 I have my reason (อ้ายมีเหตุผล)
 Father's words. (คำสอนของพ่อ)
 Nether on Facebook nor Line. (เฟสก็หายไลน์ก็เงียบ)
 Babe, I wanna make up with you. (คนดีพี่มาง้อ) (Featuring Tanya R-Siam)
 Online Love (สื่อรักออนไลน์)
 The last hug (กอดครั้งสุดท้าย) (Featuring Tanya R-Siam)
 Let you go (ให้น้องไปสา)
 My life for you (Ost.Sankatmochan Mahabali Hanuman) (ลมหายใจพลีให้เธอ)
 The two greatest things in my life (Ost.Chaloei Suek) (สองสิ่งที่ยิ่งใหญ่)
 I did all I could (อ้ายเฮ็ดทุกวิถีทาง)(Featuring Kong Huayrai)

Dramas 
 2022 Krasue Lam Sing (กระสือลำซิ่ง) (Cheer Up/Ch.8) as Ble Patumrach R-Siam

Series 
 20  (/Ch.) as

Sitcom 
 20  (/Ch.) as

Movies 
 20  as

MC
 Online 
 2022 : น่ารักสัตว์สัตว์ EP.1 On Air YouTube:เบิ้ล ปทุมราช

References

External links
 

1996 births
Living people
21st-century Thai male singers
Male singer-songwriters
People from Amnat Charoen province
Ble Patumrach R-Siam
Thai people of Laotian descent
Thai male singers
Thai mor lam musicians
Thai singer-songwriters
Thai male actors
Thai male television actors
Thai male film actors
21st-century Thai male actors
Thai television personalities
Thai YouTubers